Vidrio is a Spanish surname. Notable people with the surname include:

Jacinda Vidrio, a fictional character in the TV series Once Upon a Time
Manuel Vidrio (born 1972), Mexican footballer
Néstor Vidrio (born 1989), Mexican footballer

Spanish-language surnames